The 1949 Mississippi Southern Southerners football team was an American football team that represented Mississippi Southern College (now known as the University of Southern Mississippi) as a member of the Gulf States Conference during the 1949 college football season. In their first year under head coach Thad Vann, the team compiled a 7–3 record.

Schedule

References

Mississippi Southern
Southern Miss Golden Eagles football seasons
Mississippi Southern Southerners football